Anokhino is a rural locality (a village) in Novoselskoye Rural Settlement, Kovrovsky District, Vladimir Oblast, Russia. The population was 3 as of 2010. There are 3 streets.

Geography 
Anokhino is located 26 km southwest of Kovrov (the district's administrative centre) by road. Pestovo is the nearest rural locality.

References 

Rural localities in Kovrovsky District